When I Came Home is a 2006 documentary by Dan Lohaus about homeless veterans in the United States - from those who served in Vietnam to those returning from the Iraq War.  The film won the "New York Loves Film Best Documentary" Award at the 2006 Tribeca Film Festival.

Content 
The film looks at the challenges faced by returning combat veterans and the battle many must fight against the Veterans Administration for the benefits promised to them. Through the story of Herold Noel, an Iraq War veteran suffering from post-traumatic stress disorder and living out of his car in Brooklyn, it reveals a failing system and the veteran's struggle to survive after returning from war.  The film reports that as of March 2006, 500 Iraq War veterans are homeless.

Production 
In addition to Noel, Paul Rieckhoff the Executive Director and Founder of Iraq and Afghanistan Veterans of America (IAVA), makes several appearances in the film. Rachel Maddow and Chuck D,  talk radio hosts of the Air America Radio network, also make a brief appearances in the film.

MPAA rating: not rated
Running time: 70 minutes

See also
Veterans Administration
Homelessness in the United States
Veteran

References

External links
Official website of the film

Variety Review
Cinematical Review

2006 films
American documentary films
Documentary films about the Iraq War
Documentary films about homelessness in the United States
Documentary films about veterans
2006 documentary films
Documentary films about post-traumatic stress disorder
2000s English-language films
2000s American films
English-language documentary films